Lone Star College–Montgomery (formerly Montgomery College or MC) is a Texas community college in The Woodlands, Montgomery County, Texas, United States, south of the city of Conroe.

It was founded in 1992 and is part of the Lone Star College System, serving the Montgomery County area.

The school enrolled just over 9,200 credit students in the fall 2007 semester and is the only Lone Star College System college to offer biotechnology, physical therapist assistant, human services and land surveying degrees.

The campus supports many extracurricular clubs, such as Club 429: The Queer-Straight Alliance, Anime Club, The Student Geomatics Association, The Student Veterans Association, Psychology Club, International Students Organization, and foreign language organizations. 

The current campus was dedicated August 14, 1995, by then-Governor George W. Bush.

Notable alumni

 Preston Fassel, novelist and journalist, Class of 2009

External links
 Official site
 
 

Montgomery
Education in Montgomery County, Texas
Educational institutions established in 1992
Two-year colleges in the United States
Buildings and structures in Montgomery County, Texas
Conroe, Texas
1992 establishments in Texas